The 1966 Oklahoma State Cowboys football team represented Oklahoma State University during the 1966 NCAA University Division football season.

Schedule

Game summaries

Oklahoma

    
    
    
    

Oklahoma State defensive backs Charlie Trimble and Willard Nahrgang stopped Oklahoma tailback Ron Shotts at the two on the conversion play to preserve their second straight win over the Sooners.

After the season

The 1967 NFL/AFL Draft was held on March 14–15, 1967. The following Cowboys were selected.

References

Oklahoma State
Oklahoma State Cowboys football seasons
Oklahoma State Cowboys football